The FIVB World Grand Prix 2008 was a women's volleyball tournament in which 12 countries competed from 20 June to 12 July 2008. The finals were held in Yokohama Arena, Yokohama, Japan. Cuba, Brazil, Dominican Republic and the United States qualified for the tournament at the 2007 Women's Pan-American Cup in Colima, Mexico. Germany, Turkey, Italy, and Poland qualified through the European Qualifying Tournament in Ankara, Turkey.  China, Japan, Thailand, and Kazakhstan qualified as the best four Asian teams.

Competing nations
The following national teams  qualified:

Calendar

Teams

Preliminary rounds

Ranking
The host Japan and top five teams in the preliminary round advance to the Final round.

|}

First round

Group A

|}

Group B

|}

Group C

|}

Second round

Group D

|}

Group E

|}

Group F

|}

Third round

Group G

|}

Group H

|}

Group I

|}

Final round
Venue– Yokohama Arena, Yokohama

|}

Final ranking

|}

Overall ranking

Individual awards

Most Valuable Player:

Best Spiker:

Best Blocker:

Best Server:

Best Libero:

Best Setter:

Best Scorer:

References
FIVB official site

FIVB World Grand Prix
2008 in Japanese sport
International volleyball competitions hosted by Japan
2008